This is a list of airports in Tajikistan, grouped by type and sorted by location.

Tajikistan, officially the Republic of Tajikistan, is a mountainous landlocked country in Central Asia. Afghanistan borders it to the south, Uzbekistan to the west, Kyrgyzstan to the north, and People's Republic of China to the east.  Tajikistan also lies adjacent to Pakistan, separated by the narrow Wakhan Corridor. Its capital city is Dushanbe.



Airports 
Airport names shown in bold have scheduled passenger service on commercial airlines.

See also 

 List of airports by ICAO code: U#UT - Tajikistan, Turkmenistan, Uzbekistan
 Transport in Tajikistan
 Wikipedia: WikiProject Aviation/Airline destination lists: Asia#Tajikistan

References 
 
 
 Airports in Tajikistan. World Aero Data.
 Airports in Tajikistan. The Airport Guide.
 Airports in Tajikistan. Great Circle Mapper.

 
Tajikistan
Airports
Airports
Tajikistan